Surf Riders, known in Japan as , and in Europe as Gerry Lopez Surf Riders, is a video game developed by ACOT and published by KSS and Ubi Soft for the PlayStation in 1999-2000.

Gameplay
In this game the player receives a score based on variety, endurance and the difficulty of tricks performed on beaches throughout the world.

There are five beaches to surf, each providing different waves to ride:
Manly Beach, Australia
Grand Plage, Lacanau, France
Huntington Beach, California
Tonami Beach, Japan
Pipeline, Hawaii

Reception

The game received "mixed" reviews according to the review aggregation website Metacritic. IGN called the game "ridiculously hard, but once you get into it, it's ridiculously fun". GameSpot said that it was a fun game, but it lacked variety. Chris Charla of NextGen said that the game was "too limited to earn another star, but it is unquestionably addictive as hell." In Japan, Famitsu gave it a score of 23 out of 40.

References

External links
 

1999 video games
KSS (company) games
PlayStation (console) games
PlayStation (console)-only games
Surfing video games
Ubisoft games
Video games developed in Japan